Zhejiang Tonglu High School (浙江省桐庐中学) is a high school in Tonglu, Hangzhou, China. It was founded in 1941. In 2016 it had 2,048 students and 218 teachers. It has 293 mǔ or 20 hectares.

References

External links
 Zhejiang Tonglu High School

Education in Hangzhou
Buildings and structures in Hangzhou
High schools in Zhejiang